Nakhla Dam is a rock-filled embankment dam in northern Morocco, to the southeast of El Hamma. The primary purpose of the dam is water supply to the city of Tetouan,  to the south. The dam was completed in 1961 but major reinforcement works were carried out in 1968. The P4701 road passes on its western side.

References

Dams in Morocco
Geography of Tanger-Tetouan-Al Hoceima
Rock-filled dams
Dams completed in 1961
20th-century architecture in Morocco